Elis is an album by Brazilian singer Elis Regina released in 1977, produced by César Camargo Mariano.

Track listing
Caxangá (Milton Nascimento - Fernando Brant)
Colagem (Cláudio Lucci)
Vecchio novo (José Márcio Pereira - Cláudio Lucci)
Morro velho (Milton Nascimento)
Qualquer dia (Vitor Martins - Ivan Lins)
Romaria (Renato Teixeira)
A dama do apocalipse (Crispin - Nathan Marques)
Cartomante (Vitor Martins - Ivan Lins)
Sentimental eu fico (Renato Teixeira)
Transversal do tempo (Aldir Blanc - João Bosco)

References

Elis Regina albums
1977 albums